Leo Fleider (October 12, 1913 in Hermanowa, Poland - August 5, 1977 in  Buenos Aires, Argentina) was a Polish born Argentine film director and screenwriter, and one of the influential directors in the Cinema of Argentina of the classic era.

He directed some 30 films between the early 1950s and 1974 such as Amor a primera vista (1956), Aconcagua (1964) and Arriba juventud (1971).

Filmography
 The Prodigal Woman (1945) (with Mario Soffici and Ralph Pappier)
 Sombras en la frontera (1951)
 Locuras, tiros y mambos (1951)
 Los sobrinos del Zorro (1952)
 La Muerte en las calles (1952)
 Trompada 45 (1953)
 La Casa grande (1953)
 Desalmados en pena (1954)
 Torrente indiano (1954)
 Los Hermanos corsos (1955)
 Vida nocturna (1955)
 Novia para dos (1956)
 Amor a primera vista (1956)
 Campo arado (1959)
 Interpol llamando a Río (1961)
 Canuto Cañete, conscripto del 7 (1963)
 Aconcagua (1964)
 Canuto Cañete y los 40 ladrones (1964)
 Canuto Cañete, detective privado (1965)
 Ahorro y préstamo... para el amor (1965)
 Vivir es formidable (1966)
 Escala musical (1966)
 El derecho de comer (1968)
 Los debutantes en el amor (1969)
 Cautiva en la selva (1969)
 Muchacho (1970)
 Arriba Juventud (1971)
 Siempre te amaré (1971)
 Embrujo de amor (1971)
 Piloto de pruebas (1972)
 Destino de un capricho (1972)
 Titanes en el ring (1973)
 Crimen en el hotel alojamiento (1974)
 Esta es mi Argentina (1974)
 Operación rosa rosa (1974)

References

External links

1913 births
1977 deaths
Polish emigrants to Argentina
Polish film directors
Polish screenwriters
Argentine film directors
Male screenwriters
20th-century Argentine screenwriters
20th-century Argentine male writers